Tunneling to the Center of the Earth is the debut short story collection of Kevin Wilson, published in April 2009 by Ecco/HarperCollins.

Reviews
The New York Times states, "Wilson offers fabulous twists and somersaults of the imagination" and his work is "daring and often exquisitely tender."

Awards

References

External links
Official website

2009 short story collections
American short story collections
Fantasy short story collections
Debut books
HarperCollins books